In algebra, the Brahmagupta–Fibonacci identity expresses the product of two sums of two squares as a sum of two squares in two different ways. Hence the set of all sums of two squares is closed under multiplication. Specifically, the identity says

For example,

The identity is also known as the Diophantus identity,  as it was first proved by Diophantus of Alexandria.  It is a special case of Euler's four-square identity, and also of Lagrange's identity. 

Brahmagupta proved and used a more general Brahmagupta identity, stating

This shows that, for any fixed A, the set of all numbers of the form x2 + Ay2 is closed under multiplication.

These identities hold for all integers, as well as all rational numbers; more generally, they are true in any commutative ring.  All four forms of the identity can be verified by expanding each side of the equation.  Also, (2) can be obtained from (1), or (1) from (2), by changing b to −b, and likewise with (3) and (4).

History
The identity first appeared in Diophantus' Arithmetica (III, 19), of the third century A.D.
It was rediscovered by Brahmagupta (598–668), an Indian mathematician and astronomer, who generalized it to the Brahmagupta's identity, and used it in his study of what is now called Pell's equation. His Brahmasphutasiddhanta was translated from Sanskrit into Arabic by Mohammad al-Fazari, and was subsequently translated into Latin in 1126. The identity was introduced in western Europe in 1225 by Fibonacci, in The Book of Squares, and, therefore, the identity has been often attributed to him.

Related identities

Analogous identities are Euler's four-square related to quaternions, and Degen's eight-square derived from the octonions which has connections to Bott periodicity. There is also Pfister's sixteen-square identity, though it is no longer bilinear.

These identities are strongly related with Hurwitz's classification of composition algebras.

Multiplication of complex numbers 

If a, b, c, and d are real numbers, the Brahmagupta–Fibonacci identity is equivalent to the multiplicativity property for absolute values of complex numbers:

This can be seen as follows: expanding the right side and squaring both sides, the multiplication property is equivalent to

and by the definition of absolute value this is in turn equivalent to

An equivalent calculation in the case that the variables a, b, c, and d are rational numbers shows the identity may be interpreted as the statement that the norm in the field Q(i) is multiplicative: the norm is given by 
 
and the multiplicativity calculation is the same as the preceding one.

Application to Pell's equation 
In its original context, Brahmagupta applied his discovery of this identity to the solution of Pell's equation x2 − Ay2 = 1. Using the identity in the more general form

he was able to "compose" triples (x1, y1, k1) and (x2, y2, k2) that were solutions of x2 − Ay2 = k, to generate the new triple

Not only did this give a way to generate infinitely many solutions to x2 − Ay2 = 1 starting with one solution, but also, by dividing such a composition by k1k2, integer or "nearly integer" solutions could often be obtained. The general method for solving the Pell equation given by Bhaskara II in 1150, namely the chakravala (cyclic) method, was also based on this identity.

Writing integers as a sum of two squares 
When used in conjunction with one of Fermat's theorems, the Brahmagupta–Fibonacci identity proves that the product of a square and any number of primes of the form 4n + 1 is a sum of two squares.

See also

 Brahmagupta matrix
 Indian mathematics
 List of Indian mathematicians
 Sum of two squares theorem

Notes

References

External links
Brahmagupta's identity at PlanetMath
Brahmagupta Identity on MathWorld
 A Collection of Algebraic Identities

Algebra
Brahmagupta
Elementary algebra
Mathematical identities
Squares in number theory